The Black Widow is a Zamperla Giant Discovery pendulum ride which is located at the Kennywood amusement park in West Mifflin, Pennsylvania, near Pittsburgh. It opened on June 8, 2012.

History
In late June 2011, Kennywood listed its Pitt Fall ride for sale with the International Rides Management brokerage company. On December 15, 2011, Kennywood announced that Black Widow would be added for the 2012 season, replacing the Pitt Fall. The attraction was shut down three months prior on September 18. Black Widow officially opened to the public on June 8, 2012.

Ride

The giant circle swings in a pendulum motion while switching between clockwise and counterclockwise rotations.

See also
 2012 in amusement parks

References

External links
 Black Widow on Kennywood's website

Amusement rides introduced in 2012
Kennywood
Pendulum rides
Amusement rides manufactured by Zamperla